Randy Wood was born on November 4, 1970, at Hill Air Force Base, Utah and grew up in North Olmsted, a suburb of Cleveland, Ohio. He is an artist and performer who currently lives in Seattle, Washington.

His comics and illustrations have appeared in numerous publications including The Stranger and the Anchorage Press. His paintings and installations have been shown around the US and Canada at such places as the Henry Art Gallery, Grand Central Art Center, and Aqua Art Miami. He has been a member of the Seattle artist-run gallery SOIL since 2001.

External links
Randy Wood

The Stranger Newspaper
The Grand Central Art Center
SOIL
Aqua Art Miami

1970 births
Living people
People from North Olmsted, Ohio
Artists from Seattle